Leonardo Schulz Cardoso (born July 5, 1992), also known as Leo Stronda, is a Brazilian bodybuilder, YouTuber and former rapper. He was vocalist and one of the founders of the hip-hop duo Bonde da Stronda. He is also known for his clothing line, XXT Corporation. Stronda has a channel in Brazil about bodybuilding, Fábrica de Monstros, with more than 2,5 million subscribers, but he lost the channel because of contract problems. His new channel is called simply Leo Stronda and it's currently with 3 million subscribers.

Biography
Leonardo Schulz Cardoso was born 5 July 1992, in Rio de Janeiro, Brazil. He is a childhood friend of Diego Villanueva, with whom he formed the group Bonde da Stronda in 2006.

Cardoso is also a bodybuilder who began to be interested in the sport at the age of 16. He has participated in several competitions. The single "Bonde da Maromba" references his bodybuilding and was released along with a music video on 17 December 2012. His social media presence includes posts on nutrition, health, wellness, training tips as well as projects and competitions.

Clothing line
Cardoso is the founder and owner of the alternative clothing line "XXT Corporation". His latest collection released is "Lion Schulz".

Personal life
On March 6, 2023, Stronda announced on its YouTube channel that it is no longer part of Bonde da Stronda. He said that he is "thirsty for Jesus Christ" and that he now defends a new ideology.

Stronda is a Christian.

References

External links
Léo Twitter official
Léo YouTube official

21st-century Brazilian male singers
21st-century Brazilian singers
Brazilian male singer-songwriters
Living people
1992 births